Slender: The Arrival (also written as Slender – The Arrival or Slender The Arrival) is a first-person survival horror video game developed by Blue Isle Studios among Parsec Productions as a fully realized, commercial version to Parsec Productions' Slender: The Eight Pages, with Chapter 9 being a remake of the aforementioned game. It is the fifth video game adaptation based on the Slender Man mythos. It was released on Microsoft Windows and OS X on March 26, 2013. Thereafter, the game was released on Xbox 360 and PlayStation 3 in September 2014. It was released for PlayStation 4 and Xbox One in March 2015, before shipping onto Wii U in October. A Nintendo Switch port was released in June 2019. In October 2021, ports for Android and iOS were released. Slender Man’s creator, Eric Knudsen, served as a producer.

Gameplay
The majority of the game takes place in abandoned areas (house, defunct mine, etc.), each with different objectives. Slender: The Arrival uses similar mechanics to its predecessor, The Eight Pages. The character is armed only with a flashlight. This limited defense forces a sense of helplessness, as the best way to survive in the game is to run whenever in danger. The Slender Man's behavior changes slightly between levels. In the first level, the Slender Man can be seen standing outside of the house through every window, once the player acquires the flashlight, and after going through the gate outside he can be seen on the top of hills well away from the player. In level two, he most often teleports off-screen or just out of the character's line of sight, but is capable of appearing directly in front of the player. It is observed that his motion centers around following the player, but consists largely of jumping from place to place, the inconvenience of which is increased as each of the eight pages are collected. His behavior is much the same as this in level four, except more active. In level three, he pursues much less aggressively, though is capable of teleporting directly in front of the player. In this level, the main antagonist is a girl who chases the player (most often following her path directly, but has been seen teleporting. It is unknown whether this is a glitch or an in-game mechanic). The only way of subduing her is by focusing the flashlight (on its second setting) on her. While looking at the Slender Man, the camera succumbs to electronic distortions such as static, blurring, color spots, audio distortion, etc., which obstructs the player's vision unless facing away, and far enough from it. The player cannot pause while this occurs, to prevent them taking a break due to being frightened. When caught, the game over screen is also different; while in Slender: The Eight Pages, the player saw a white static background with Slender Man's faceless head, the one for Slender: The Arrival is black, with an overhead-lit and color-distorted hue and less static.
There are also new choices in difficulty (which must first be unlocked by completing the game once) being easy, normal, and hardcore. In hardcore, the flashlight can run out, enemies are more aggressive and the player's stamina runs out quickly. Easy has infinite flashlight, a great deal of stamina, and the enemies are not very aggressive.

Plot

Slender: The Arrival follows the story of two childhood friends, Lauren and Kate, after the events in Slender: The Eight Pages. Kate, who is the protagonist of the Eight Pages, is selling her childhood home.

Lauren, in response to a call from Kate, comes to help sell and move Kate out of her old home, bringing a video camera with her. The road to Kate's house is blocked by a fallen tree, forcing Lauren to leave her car behind and walk there. Along the way, she passes another car (who the car belongs to is unknown). With the sun setting, Lauren discovers Kate's home, doors ajar, furniture and belongings disheveled. She also finds a flashlight and a key to Kate's room. On the walls of Kate's room are black scratchings of an ominous figure and messages. Lauren hears a woman's scream coming from outside and investigates the sound, heading into the wooded park behind the house. She activates three generators to light up the path and finds a burnt farmhouse. Inside is Charlie Matheson Jr., a boy who had disappeared years ago and is now deformed. He disappears when Lauren approaches him.

Lauren searches the wooded area for clues as to the whereabouts of her friend but only finds more scribbled drawings. As she ventures deeper into the park, she encounters a tall, faceless figure named Slender Man, who can only be seen through video cameras. After all eight pages are collected, Lauren runs from Slender Man, slipping down an embankment, hitting her head and passing out.

She regains consciousness in the morning, and still searching for Kate, Lauren stumbles upon an old abandoned coal mine. To get out, she attempts to power the emergency lift by activating six generators. Her progress is hindered by the attack of a figure known as the Chaser, who seems to have photophobia, can be hindered by Lauren's flashlight. Slender Man also attempts to attack Lauren in the mine.

Lauren powers and uses the lift to escape the mine. She reaches a storage outpost with a television and two tapes. One shows Kate (who has a video camera of her own) hurriedly scribbling upon papers before discovering that Slender Man is trying to get in, she starts to close every door and window in the house, but Slender Man manages to get inside. Kate then runs back to her room where Slender Man suddenly appears and she proceeds to jump out of the bedroom window before the tape abruptly ends. The other tape shows Carl-Ross (or CR for short), a friend of Kate, investigating a farm where he collects evidence into the story of Charles Matheson. Like Lauren and Kate, he also has a video camera. He uses gas canisters to power a generator, and looks for a key to unlock a gate to the Matheson family chapel. Charlie, now a deformed and zombie-like follower of Slenderman, pursues him and eventually chases him away. 

Lauren continues up the mountainside towards a radio tower and along the way, she can find a teddy bear. Interacting with it starts an optional level where Charlie is playing on the beach with his parents at a picnic out of reach. After being led away by collecting a trail of toy trains that lead him into the woods, he is caught by Slender Man. Continuing onward to the radio tower, Lauren finds herself emerging from a mine into a forest fire, where Slenderman aggressively pursues her.

Lauren escapes her attacker after getting inside the radio tower building and looks for a key to unlock a door. Her flashlight's batteries die as she goes through the door, only to find she has reached a dead end, containing a burnt body (who is possibly CR), a fire, and a camera with the recording of two panicked people, Kate and CR. Shortly after listening, the corridor goes dark and Charlie runs towards Lauren and she blacks out.

An additional level takes place after Kate fled into the woods where she collected the eight pages while being followed by Slender Man, after finding all the pages Slender Man catches her, claiming that he "has plans for her".

If the player has beaten the game once before, a Hardcore difficulty option will unlock, which is like the first game but more difficult. One difference is that Lauren must find gas canisters in order to power the generators in the mine. Before a game update, upon completion of the game again, Lauren will attempt to escape by jumping from a high area, in which her camera dies after she does so. After an update to the game, this ending is no longer possible to get. The game now ends with Lauren awake in the basement of the farmhouse from earlier with Charlie blocking the way out. After finding two documents, Charlie disappears. Lauren hears crying upstairs and finds Kate, but Kate turns into the Chaser (implying that they are the same person) and attacks her. Lauren's camera turns back on temporarily to show someone's legs (most likely Lauren's) being dragged away by someone unseen, who is presumably either Kate, Charlie, or Slender Man.

A secret level is also unlockable, which takes place at Kate's house in the daytime. The player's character is unknown but the goal of the level is basically a hide and seek from Slender Man.

Characters
Lauren – The game's protagonist and playable character. She comes to her friend Kate's house to help her sell it, only to find her missing. Against all odds, she proceeds to relentlessly search for Kate and any clues that might explain how she went missing.
Kate/The Chaser – A close friend of Lauren, she is also playable in 'Escape' and 'Genesis'. Her mother has recently died and she has decided to sell the house, prompting Lauren's visit with the intention to assist, but disappears. Prior to the events of the game, she had visions of the 'Slender Man' which she shared with her friend CR. The night before the events of the game, she was attacked in her home but managed to escape, as revealed in 'Escape'. CR arranges for himself and her to be burned to death in order to stop the 'curse' of the Slenderman spreading but Kate runs away and is implied to then be driven to the point of violent madness, later attacking Lauren in the mines and the Matheson house at the end. It's unknown where she got the hood and mask that she wore when she was turned into a proxy.
Carl-Ross "CR" – A friend of Kate, with whom he shared her visions of the Slender Man. He and Kate would play in the woods together as children, but when Kate's mom found out he stopped visiting. Despite asking Kate to keep his existence a secret from Lauren, he advised Kate to call her when her mom died. He is playable in 'Homestead' in which he investigates a farmland property owned by the Mathesons and finds clues suggesting that Slender Man had stalked them for generations. CR is found at the end of the game, his charred corpse next to a camcorder. A scrapbook item located next to Kate's waste-bin implies that his real name is Carl-Ross and that he may have (unreciprocated) romantic feelings towards Kate.
Slender Man – The faceless main antagonist of the game who can only be seen through video cameras. Facing him causes the camera to glitch and distort, intensifying as the player gets closer. Coming too close will result in the player's death. In the game, it is also shown that his influence can eventually drive his victims so far into insanity that they become a monstrous, violent shadow of their former selves (called "Proxies"), as with Kate and Charlie.
Charlie Matheson Jr. – The missing child. Missing posters can be found right outside Kate's house on a tree and outside the entrance of the Kullman Mine. Version 1.5 of the game has Charlie appear in the prologue, 'Homestead' and epilogue as a decaying zombie-like corpse that chases Lauren, and it is implied that he was heavily affected by Slender Man's influence but is now helping Lauren to investigate him. In 'Memories' it was shown how he was lured into the woods by Slender Man before being captured. In 'Homestead', it's shown that the farmland property Charlie and his family would often visit shows signs of the Slender Man haunting the Mathesons for generations. CR theorises that Charlie inadvertently stumbled upon evidence of this, which may have prompted the Slender Man to come after him in particular.

Development
Slender: The Arrival was developed by Blue Isle Studios and Parsec Productions for Microsoft Windows and Apple Mac. The developers were considering a release for the PlayStation Network for the PlayStation 3, and Xbox Live Arcade for the Xbox 360. Blue Isle Studios worked with indie game publisher Midnight City to help develop the game for other platforms.

Eight screenshots were released on the official Slender: The Arrival website, followed by four on the Blue Isle Studio website. A trailer was released for the game on December 23, 2012.

On December 1, 2012, Blue Isle Studios announced its partnership with the Marble Hornets team, a YouTube channel known for its horror videos which heavily featured Slender Man, and helped to shape the modern version of the Slender Man. Joseph DeLage, Tim Sutton and Troy Wagner helped write the script for the initial release of the game.

On February 9, 2013, Slender: The Arrival was opened to the public for beta testing. If one pre-ordered the game, they were entitled to a free demo of the game. Pre-orders were $5 each, but once the game was released, it would be $10.

On October 1, 2021, Blue Isle Studios announced that the game will be released for Android and iOS on October 13 of the same year, with the first chapter being available for free.

Reception

Slender: The Arrival received mixed reviews, with critics praising its soundtrack, tense atmosphere and scares, but also criticizing its shorter than expected campaign length and repetitive gameplay. Aggregating review website Metacritic gave the Xbox 360 version 61/100 based on 5 reviews, the Microsoft Windows version 65/100 based on 30 reviews, the PlayStation 4 version 60/100 based on 8 reviews, the Xbox One version 59/100 based on 6 reviews, and the PlayStation 3 version 48/100 based on 4 reviews.

In a positive review, The Escapist said "you may have mixed feelings about its brevity and the repetitive mechanics, but it's certainly a well-built game that, above all, is scary to play" and gave the game a score of 4.5 stars out of 5. VVGtv gave the game a score of 8.8/10, praising the game's graphics, sound, gameplay (with the exception of a few elements) and mystery element, while criticising the short story, adding that "if you played The Eight Pages and are looking for the next scare to really get your adrenaline pumping and to get you to yell like you did when you first saw Slenderman right behind you, this game will not disappoint". GameSpot gave the game a score of 8.5/10, calling it "one of the most terrifying games in recent memory".

In a negative review, VideoGamer.com said The Arrival is a "frustrating game, not just because it can be occasionally unfair but because these guys clearly have no idea how to promote fear. Running around playing kiss chase with a trans-dimensional being doesn't really cut it." and gave it a score of 4/10.

References

External links 
 

2013 video games
Abandoned buildings and structures in fiction
2010s horror video games
Indie video games
MacOS games
Nintendo Switch games
PlayStation 3 games
PlayStation 4 games
PlayStation Network games
Slender Man
Video game remakes
Video game sequels
Video games developed in Canada
Video games featuring female protagonists
Wii U eShop games
Wii U games
Windows games
Works about missing people
Works based on Internet-based works
Xbox 360 games
Xbox 360 Live Arcade games
Xbox One games
Single-player video games